Ambulyx meeki is a species of moth of the  family Sphingidae. It is known from the Solomon Islands.

It can be distinguished from other Ambulyx species by the conspicuous olive antemedian and discal bands of the forewing upperside. It is similar to Ambulyx wildei, but the submarginal line of the forewing is more curved.

Subspecies
Ambulyx meeki meeki (Solomon Islands)
Ambulyx meeki makirae Tennent & Kitching, 1998 (Solomon Islands)
Ambulyx meeki pyrrhina (Jordan, 1923) (Solomon Islands)

References

Ambulyx
Moths described in 1903
Moths of Oceania